Attorney General Downer may refer to:

Henry Edward Downer (1836–1905), Attorney-General of South Australia
John Downer (1843–1915), Attorney-General of South Australia